State Highway 16 ( RJ SH 16) is a State Highway in the Rajasthan state of India that connects Chawa in the Barmer district of Rajasthan with Amritia in the Rajsamand district of Rajasthan. The total length of RJ SH 16 is 276 km. 

This highway connects National Highway 112 in Chawa to National Highway 8 in Amartiya. Other cities and towns on this highway are: Sindhari, Jalore, Ahore, Takhatgarh, Sanderao, Falna, Bali, Sadri, Desuri and Garbor.

The Jalore to Sanderao section of the road is being converted into National Highway 325 (India).

See also
 List of State Highways in Rajasthan
 Roads in Pali district

References
 State Highway

Pali district
Jalore district
State Highways in Rajasthan